CIMT may refer to:
 CIMT-DT, a Canadian TV station
 Cartoid Intima-Media Thickness (CIMT), see Intima-media thickness, a measurement of the thickness of the innermost layers of the artery
 Constraint-induced movement therapy, a type of rehabilitation therapy
 :fr: Compagnie industrielle de matériel de transport